The 2001–02 Wisconsin Badgers women's ice hockey team was the Badgers' 3rd season. Head coach Trina Bourget was in her final season as Badgers head coach. The Badgers record in the WCHA was 17-6-1 with a second-place ranking.

Regular season

Schedule

Awards and honors

Meghan Hunter, AHCA All-American, Second Team
Meghan Hunter, All-WCHA, First Team
Kerry Weiland, AHCA All-American, First Team
 Kerry Weiland, All-WCHA, First Team
Kerry Weiland, CoSIDA Academic All-District V

Team awards
Kendra Anthony, Offensive Player of the Year award
Kathy Devereaux, Badger Award
Kathryn Greaves, W Club Community Service Award
Carla MacLeod and Kerry Weiland, Defensive Player of the Year award
Carla MacLeod, Rookie of the Year
Sis Paulsen, Jeff Sauer Award
Kerry Weiland, UW Athletic Board scholars

References

Wisconsin Badgers women's ice hockey seasons
Wisconsin
Wiscon
Wiscon